Víctor Fabián Pacheco (born September 12, 1972 in Montevideo, Uruguay) is a former Uruguayan footballer who played for clubs of Uruguay, Chile and Mexico. Adic Champion with the Salesian of the Coast 2018. 2018 club pinar 99 - liga regional del este .

Teams
  Liverpool 1993-1997
  Real Zacatepec 1997-1998
  Liverpool 1998-2000
  Deportes Puerto Montt 2001
  El Tanque Sisley 2002-2004
  Progreso 2005
  El Tanque Sisley 2006-2007
  Salesiano de la Costa FC 2015-2018

References
Profile at BDFA 

Profile at Tenfield Digital 

01/09/2015 DT in Salesiano de la Costa FC 

1972 births
Living people
Uruguayan footballers
Uruguayan expatriate footballers
Liverpool F.C. (Montevideo) players
C.A. Progreso players
El Tanque Sisley players
Puerto Montt footballers
Chilean Primera División players
Expatriate footballers in Chile
Expatriate footballers in Mexico
Association football defenders